Melnilaivayal  is a village in the Arimalamrevenue block of Pudukkottai district, Tamil Nadu, India.

Demographics 

As per the 2001 census, Melnilaivayal had a total population of 2290 with 1084 males and 1206 females. Out of the total population 1161 people were literate.
It is one of the Vallambar and other few community peoples village.

Temples
 Pillaiyar Kovil 
 Amman Kovil 
 Ayyanar Kovil

References

Villages in Pudukkottai district